Best of UGK is the third compilation album by American Southern hip hop duo UGK. It was released on June 17, 2003 via Jive Records. Production was handled by Bernie Bismark, Shetoro Henderson, N.O. Joe, DJ DMD, Sergio, and Pimp C. It featured guest appearance from Devin the Dude.

Track listing

Charts

References

UGK albums
2003 greatest hits albums
Albums produced by N.O. Joe
Gangsta rap compilation albums
Jive Records compilation albums